Charman is an English surname. Notable people with the surname include:

 Jamie Charman (born 1982), Australian football player
 Janet Charman (born 1954), New Zealand poet 
 John Charman (born 1953), English businessman 
 Luke Charman (born 1997), English footballer
 Matt Charman (born 1979), British screenwriter and playwright
 Roy Charman (1930–1990), English sound engineer 
 Terry Charman (1950–2019), English historian 
 William Charman (1850–1924), English cricketer 

English-language surnames